Bessy was a long-running Belgian comics series created by Willy Vandersteen and Karel Verschuere in 1952. Together with Suske en Wiske and De Rode Ridder it was once one of his most popular and best-selling series, with successful translations in Dutch, French, German and Swedish. It was terminated in 1997.

Concept

Inspired by the success of Lassie, Willy Vandersteen and Karel Verschuere decided to make a comic strip series about a female collie. Contrary to the original Lassie series, though, it did not feature any child characters and was set in the Wild West rather than the present time. Bessy was given an owner, Andy Cayoon, with whom she had many adventures involving cowboys and Native Americans.

Publication history

Bessy was first published in the French-language Belgian newspaper La Libre Belgique on December 24, 1952, and translated into Dutch a year later, when the comics were published in De Standaard and De Katholieke Illustratie. The series were also a tremendous success in Germany, where they were published in the youth magazines Pony and Felix. So much in fact, that Vandersteen's studio had a separate team drawing new titles, many of which were never translated in Dutch. With 992 different titles, reissues included, Bessy has the most album titles of all of Vandersteen's series. 164 albums of these were Dutch, 151 were French. The series was also published in Sweden under the name Bessie, which spawned 92 albums.

The high production unfortunately also had an effect on the quality of the stories and drawings. As a result, the German editions were discontinued by 1985. One of Vandersteen's assistants, Jeff Broeckx, then created a reboot Bessy Natuurkommando ("Bessy Nature Commando") (1984-1992), where Andy and Bessy were reimagined as present-day conservators of animals and nature. Andy received a love interest, Aneka, and a little street boy named Kid, who travelled along with them on their missions. The scripts were written by Marck Meul. Twenty-three albums were drawn before the series was terminated in 1992. Broeckx tried a new reboot and redrew the first seven stories of the original series, as well as the twelfth story from the first series. By 1997 the series came to a definite halt.

References

1952 comics debuts
1997 comics endings
Belgian comic strips
Belgian comics titles
Belgian comics characters
Comics about dogs
Comics characters introduced in 1952
Drama comics
Educational comics
Fictional dogs
Western (genre) comics
Comics by Willy Vandersteen
Female characters in comics